Fairfield Township is one of thirteen townships in Tippecanoe County, Indiana. As of the 2010 census, its population was 51,113 and it contained 24,527 housing units.

History
Ely Homestead, a historic home in Fairfield Township, was listed on the National Register of Historic Places in 1976.

Geography

Cities and towns
 Lafayette (north three-quarters)

Unincorporated communities
 Eastwich at 
 Birmingham at 
 Elston at 
 Tecumseh at 
(This list is based on USGS data and may include former settlements.)

Adjacent townships
 Tippecanoe Township (north)
 Washington Township (northeast)
 Perry Township (east)
 Sheffield Township (southeast)
 Wea Township (south)
 Union Township (southwest)
 Wabash Township (northwest)

Cemeteries
The township contains ten cemeteries: Davis, Greenbush, Isley, Lafayette City Burial Grounds, Rest Haven Memorial Park, Sons of Abraham, Spring Vale, Saint Boniface, Saint Joseph's, Saint Marys, and Temple Israel.

Major highways
  Interstate 65
  US Route 52
  US Route 231

Airports and landing strips
 Aretz Airport (Closed since 1999)

School districts
 Lafayette School Corporation
 Tippecanoe School Corporation

Political districts
 Indiana's 4th congressional district
 State House District 26
 State House District 27
 State House District 41
 State Senate District 07
 State Senate District 22

References
 United States Census Bureau 2007 TIGER/Line Shapefiles
 United States Board on Geographic Names (GNIS)
 United States National Atlas

External links
 Fairfield Township
 Indiana Township Association
 United Township Association of Indiana

Townships in Tippecanoe County, Indiana
Lafayette metropolitan area, Indiana
Townships in Indiana